Yvonne De Rosa (born 21 October  1975 in Naples), is an Italian photographer.

Biography
Yvonne De Rosa graduated in Political Science, then relocated to London, where she studied at Central Saint Martins College of Art & Design.  She has subsequently exhibited photographs.

In 2006 she was awarded the "Women International Prize in Photography" and shortlisted for the “Association of Photographers Open", whilst in 2007, her series Afterdark was awarded First Prize in Fine Art Landscapes at the International Photography Awards (IPA).  Later that year, her debut book Crazy God won an award from the World Health Organization and was exhibited at "The World Conference on Poverty and Health" in Venice. Her second book, Hidden Identities, Unfinished, published in 2013, has been presented with a solo show at the V&A Museum of Childhood of London.

Her work was commissioned and showcased as part of the “One Gallery, One Night: Emerging Women in Photography” exhibition, sponsored by Kodak.

She is a founding member of the group 24, which exhibited work in unlikely places, such as Soho and Trafalgar Square.

In 2020 her work “correspondence" has been shown in Iran at the Hasht Cheshmeh Art Space of Kashan.

De Rosa's research is now focused on the representation of memory and truth and on the documentary and narrative aspects of photography. The artist often proceeds by doing research, aimed at reconstructing the story of unknown people met by chance. To do this he retrieves objects in the markets, speaks with possible witnesses still alive, takes photographs in the key places of the narration. After patiently collecting all the clues and traces, De Rosa builds photographic shots of what happened.

She currently lives between Naples and London, where she works as a freelance photographer.

Exhibitions
Crazy God Solo Exhibition, INTERNATIONAL FESTIVAL OF CONTEMPORARY ARTS – CITY OF WOMEN, Ljubljana, 2010
Crazy God Solo Exhibition, Diemar/Noble Photography, London, 2010
Crazy God Solo Exhibition, PAN - Palazzo delle Arti di Napoli, 13 Dec 2008 - 2 Feb 2009 
Crazy God Solo Exhibition, Redchurch Street, E2, Presented by The Cynthia Corbett Gallery, London, 2008
24:2008 Group exhibition at AOP Association of Photographers Gallery, 2008
Bridge Art Fair, London, Delayed Dreams, The Cynthia Corbett Gallery, London, 2007
Berliner Liste, Berlin, The Cynthia Corbett Gallery, London, 2007
24:2007. SSROBIN Gallery. Canary Wharf, London, 2007
Red Dot Art Fair New York, The Cynthia Corbett Gallery, London, 2007
Yvonne de Rosa contacts, Christina Benz liquid, Trafalgar Hotel, Trafalgar Square London, The Cynthia Corbett Gallery, 2007
Art 212, Contemporary Art Fair NYC, The Cynthia Corbett Gallery, London, 2006
contacts, Solo Exhibition at the Blenheim Gallery, Notting Hill, The Cynthia Corbett Gallery, London, 2006
Nova Art Fair Chicago, The Cynthia Corbett Gallery, London, 2006
24:2006, Trafalgar Hotel, Trafalgar Square, London, 2006
Women in Photography International Exhibition, One Gallery, One Night, One Chance _ sponsored by Kodak, The Hospital, London, 2005
AAF Contemporary Art Fair NYC, The Cynthia Corbett Gallery, London, 2005
Rollo Contemporary Art – “The Writer”, Series of Photographs of the Work of Giancarlo Neri, London, 2005
artLondon, The Cynthia Corbett Gallery, London, 2005
Glasgow Art Fair, The Cynthia Corbett Gallery, London, 2005
Dance project, Hampstead, London, 2005
24, Soho Square, London, 2005
Arco Madrid, The Cynthia Corbett Gallery, London, 2005
24, Mezzo Café, unfinished London College  of Communication, 2003
Exhibition at Italsider space in Naples, 2002
V&A Museum of Childhood, London, 2014 / 2015

Awards
2007

Crazy God selected by The World Health Organization & showcased at the World Conference on Poverty and Health.
International Photography Award (IPA)
Prize in the category of Professional Photographer of the Year (Fine Art)

2006

Awarded the “Woman International Prize in Photography”
The Association of Photographers Annual AOP Open (Shortlisted)

Publication
With Sarah Emily Miano (text), Laura Noble (preface). Crazy God. Published by Damiani, 2008. , 
Hidden Identities, Unfinished. Published by Damiani, 2013.

Selected Commissions
2005

Photographic interpretation of  "The Writer" in Hampstead Heath by Giancarlo Neri. Commissioned by Giancarlo Neri.
Deck chair dream project for Royal Park. Commissioned by Royal Park.
“Capturing the diversity of London”, the launch of the latest Easy Share-one camera for Kodak. Commissioned by Kodak.

References

External links
 Official Website
 Official Blog

1975 births
Living people
21st-century Italian women artists
21st-century women photographers
Photographers from Naples
Italian women photographers
Italian contemporary artists
Alumni of Central Saint Martins